Boris Smirnov-Rusetsky (21 January 1905 – 7 August 1993) was a Soviet painter, member of Amaravella group. (In Sanskrit language Amaravella means immortality sprouts).

He was influenced by ideas of Russian cosmism and eastern mysticism.

Biography timeline 
1905  - Born on January 21 in St.Petersburg
1917  - Moved to Moscow with family
1922  - Joined the Moscow Engineering Financial University
1923  - The first exhibition in Moscow
1941-1955 - Imprisoned in Saratov and then in Rybinsk, Akmolinsk and Makinsk
1956  - Rehabilitated after 20th Congress of the CPSU. Returns to Moscow
1967  - Personal exhibition in Moscow
1969  - Second personal exhibition in Moscow
1979-1993 - Exhibitions in Moscow, Kiev, Pskov, Mongolia, Finland, Berlin and other places
1993  - Smirnov-Rusetsky died on August 7 in St.Petersburg

Bibliography 
 Yury Linnik Crystal of Aquarius: Book about the Artist B.A.Smirnov-Rusetsky, Petrozavodsk, 231 pp., 1995 (in Russian).

References

External links 

Soviet painters
1905 births
1993 deaths